Albany is a town in Delaware and Randolph counties in the U.S. state of Indiana, along the Mississinewa River. The population was 2,295 at the 2020 census. It is part of the Muncie, IN Metropolitan Statistical Area.

History
Albany was founded in 1833. It was likely named after Albany, New York.

Geography
Albany is located at  (40.30, -85.24).

Demographics

2020 census
As of the census of 2020,  there were 2,295 people, 946 households, and 528 families living in the town. The racial makeup of the town was 93.9% White, 0.8% African American, 0.5% Asian, 0.3% Native American or Alaskan Native, 0.6% from other races, and 3.8% from two or more races. Hispanic or Latino of any race were 1.7% of the population.

There were 946 households, of which 14.9% had children under the age of 18 living with them, 51.5% were married couples living together, 30.0% had a female householder with no husband present,  15.9% had a male householder with no wife present, and 2.6% were non-families. 45.9% of all households were made up of individuals. The average household size was 2.43 and the average family size was 2.45.

20.1% of the population had never been married. 55.1% of residents were married and not separated, 7.9% were widowed, 13.6% were divorced, and 3.3% were separated.

The median age in the town was 48.1. 4.4% of residents were under the age of 5; 14.9% of residents were under the age of 18; 85.1% were age 18 or older; and 27.6% were age 65 or older. 15.2% of the population were veterans.

The only language spoken at home was English at 100% of the population. None of the population were foreign born.

The median household income in Albany was $48,483, 13.7% less than the median average for the state of Indiana. 6.7% of the population were in poverty, including 9.1% of residents under the age of 18. The poverty rate for the town was 6.2% lower than that of the state. 26.2% of the population were disabled and 8.9% had no healthcare coverage. 46.6% of the population had attained a high school or equivalent degree, 17.7% had attended college but received no degree, 10.1% had attained an Associate's degree or higher, 15.3% had attained a Bachelor's degree or higher, and 2.9% had a graduate or professional degree. 7.4% had no degree. 46.2% of Albany residents were employed, working a mean of 40.8 hours per week.

2010 census
As of the 2010 Census, there were 2,165 people, 924 households, and 602 families living in the town. The racial makeup of the town was 97.2% White, 0.6% African American, 0.2% Asian, 0.3% from other races, and 1.6% from two or more races. Hispanic or Latino of any race were 1.1% of the population.

There were 924 households, of which 30.2% had children under the age of 18 living with them, 48.8% were married couples living together, 12.6% had a female householder with no husband present, 3.8% had a male householder with no wife present, and 34.8% were non-families. 30.7% of all households were made up of individuals, and 12.9% had someone living alone who was 65 years of age or older. The average household size was 2.34 and the average family size was 2.92.

The median age in the town was 40.3 years. 24.8% of residents were under the age of 18; 7.7% were between the ages of 18 and 24; 24.3% were from 25 to 44; 27.8% were from 45 to 64; and 15.5% were 65 years of age or older. The gender makeup of the town was 47.5% male and 52.5% female.

2000 census
As of the 2000 Census, there were 2,368 people, 958 households, and 646 families living in the town. The racial makeup of the town was 98.44% White, 0.42% African American, 0.08% Native American, 0.04% Asian, 0.08% from other races, and 0.93% from two or more races. Hispanic or Latino of any race were 0.13% of the population.

There were 958 households, out of which 30.8% had children under the age of 18 living with them, 53.8% were married couples living together, 10.3% had a female householder with no husband present, and 32.5% were non-families. 28.8% of all households were made up of individuals, and 13.7% had someone living alone who was 65 years of age or older. The average household size was 2.39 and the average family size was 2.95.

In the town, the population was spread out, with 24.4% under the age of 18, 7.9% from 18 to 24, 28.2% from 25 to 44, 22.3% from 45 to 64, and 17.3% who were 65 years of age or older. The median age was 38 years. For every 100 females, there were 83.4 males. For every 100 females age 18 and over, there were 83.1 males.

The median income for a household in the town was $33,314, and the median income for a family was $40,893. Males had a median income of $33,929 versus $24,286 for females. The per capita income for the town was $16,620. About 4.5% of families and 5.9% of the population were below the poverty line, including 7.9% of those under age 18 and 1.3% of those age 65 or over.

Notable persons
 Jim Davis, cartoonist of (Garfield); Davis and his company Paws, Inc. reside between Albany and Muncie, Indiana.
 James Grover McDonald (November 29, 1886 -– September 25, 1964), United States diplomat, League of Nations High Commissioner for Refugees Coming from Germany, and first U.S. Ambassador to Israel; Albany was his hometown.

References

Towns in Delaware County, Indiana
Towns in Randolph County, Indiana
Towns in Indiana
Populated places established in 1833
1833 establishments in Indiana